The 1922 Frankford Yellow Jackets season resulted in the team finishing the year with 13-0-1 record. This included a 3-0-1 record against teams from the National Football League.

Schedule

Game notes
 Asterisk denotes a game against an NFL member in 1922.

References
1922 Frankford Yellow Jackets season record

Frankford Yellow Jackets seasons